Xhevahir Kapllani (born 21 June 1974) is an Albanian retired football goalkeeper and current coach of Erzeni in the Kategoria Superiore.

Playing career

Club
Kapllani played the majority of is career for hometown club Teuta, with whom he won the 1993–94 Albanian Superliga title, but also had spells with capital clubs Dinamo Tirana and Partizani as well as with Macedonian side Bashkimi. In his title winning season with Teuta, he recorded a 824-minute period of not conceding a league goal, putting him in the world's 148th place in the list of goalkeepers keeping the longest clean sheets by 2012.

International
He made his debut for Albania in a February 1993 FIFA World Cup qualification match against Northern Ireland in Tirana and earned a total of 5 caps, scoring no goals. His final international was an April 1996 friendly match against Bosnia.

Managerial career
Kapllani was head coach of lower league side Sukhti for a year and also was assistant coach at Teuta.

Personal life
He is an older brother of Edmond Kapllani, also football player, who has played as a striker in Germany and for the national team.

Honours
Albanian Superliga: 1
 1994

References

External links

1974 births
Living people
Footballers from Durrës
Albanian footballers
Association football goalkeepers
Albania international footballers
KF Teuta Durrës players
KS Lushnja players
FK Dinamo Tirana players
FK Partizani Tirana players
Luftëtari Gjirokastër players
KF Erzeni players
FK Bashkimi players
Besa Kavajë players
Albanian expatriate footballers
Expatriate footballers in North Macedonia
Albanian expatriate sportspeople in North Macedonia
Albanian football managers